Kirkhill railway station is a railway station serving the Kirkhill area of the town of Cambuslang, South Lanarkshire, Greater Glasgow, Scotland. The station is managed by ScotRail and is located on the Newton Line. This is the least used station on the Newton Branch.

History
The station was originally opened as part of the Lanarkshire and Ayrshire Railway on 1 August 1904. Kirkhill station was the final station to be opened on the line before it was absorbed into the London, Midland and Scottish Railway in 1923. From 1948 until 1997, services were operated by the nationalised British Railways who electrified the route in 1962.

The station was provided with a Swiss Chalet style building on the tunnel above the east of the station, which was demolished in the late 1990s.

Services

From 1974 
Following the electrification of the West Coast Main Line the basic service was:
 Monday to Saturday
two terminating trains per hour from  via 
 Sundays
 Additional peak hour services were provided to  via both sides of the Hamilton Circle.

From 1979 
Following the opening of the Argyle Line in November 1979, services on the Cathcart Circle were reorganised. The basic service was:
 Monday to Saturday
 Sundays
The removal of terminating services at Kirkhill enabled the turnback siding east of the station to be closed and lifted shortly afterwards.

From 2005 
 Monday to Sunday

References

Notes

Sources

External links

Railway stations in South Lanarkshire
Former Caledonian Railway stations
Railway stations in Great Britain opened in 1904
SPT railway stations
Railway stations served by ScotRail
Buildings and structures in Cambuslang
1904 establishments in Scotland